The 2016 Tampa Bay Buccaneers season was the franchise's 41st season in the National Football League and the first under head coach Dirk Koetter. In week 13, the club won their seventh game, eclipsing their win total from 2015.

After winning on opening day, Tampa Bay sputtered through the rest of September. Starting running back Doug Martin was sidelined for eight weeks with a hamstring injury, necessitating back-up running backs taking his place in the lineup. After receiving adequate performances from Charles Sims and Antone Smith, both subsequently ended up on injured reserve, along with wide receivers Vincent Jackson and Cecil Shorts. A victory on Monday night against division rival Carolina saw Tampa Bay begin a streak in which they won seven out of their next nine games. Between weeks 10 and 14, the Buccaneers achieved their first five-game winning streak since their first Super Bowl championship season.

Losses to the Dallas Cowboys and the New Orleans Saints late in the season hampered the Buccaneers' playoff hopes; heading into week 17, the team was still mathematically alive for a wild card berth, but despite defeating the Carolina Panthers, the team missed the playoffs for the ninth consecutive season, tied for the fourth-longest active streak in the NFL with the Jacksonville Jaguars. The Buccaneers finished tied with the Detroit Lions for the last NFC playoff spot, but lost the tiebreaker because they had a worse record against common opponents than the Lions did. Nevertheless, the Buccaneers achieved their first winning season since the 2010 campaign, when they also narrowly missed the playoffs.

Draft

Notes
 On April 3, 2015, the Tampa Bay Buccaneers traded safety Dashon Goldson to the Washington Redskins, along with a seventh round pick (#232), for a sixth round pick (#197) in the 2016 NFL Draft.

Staff

Final roster

Schedule

Preseason

Regular season

Note: Intra-division opponents are in bold text.

Game summaries

Week 1: at Atlanta Falcons

Quarterback Jameis Winston threw for 281 yards and four touchdown passes, as Tampa Bay defeated Atlanta 31–24. The Buccaneers jumped out to a 31–13 lead late in the third quarter, then held off a rally by the Falcons. Atlanta got the ball back trailing by 7 with just under two minutes to go, but managed only one first down, and turned the ball over on downs to end the game.

Week 2: at Arizona Cardinals

Arizona routed Tampa Bay 40–7. Quarterback Jameis Winston threw four interceptions and lost one fumble. Running back Doug Martin left the game in the second quarter with a hamstring injury.

Week 3: vs. Los Angeles Rams

With Los Angeles leading 37–32 at two minute warning, the game was suspended for an hour and ten minutes due to lightning in the area. When the game resumed, the Rams faced 3rd & 11 at their own 5 yard line. Case Keenum threw an incompletion, and the Rams punted to Tampa Bay. Jameis Winston drove the Buccaneers to the Rams 15 yard line in the final minute. With 4 seconds left in regulation, Winston rolled out to his left, but with no receivers open, scrambled 10 yards downfield, and was tackled at the 5 yard line to end the game.

Week 4: vs. Denver Broncos

For the second consecutive week, Tampa Bay endured a weather delay. Midway through the fourth quarter, the game was suspended for 90 minutes due to lightning. Denver defeated Tampa Bay 27–7. Jameis Winston ran for a touchdown, but threw two interceptions in the loss.

Week 5: at Carolina Panthers

Tampa Bay snapped Carolina's six game winning streak in the series, as the two clubs met on Monday Night Football. With Cam Newton sidelined due to concussion protocol, Derek Anderson started for Carolina. Anderson threw two interceptions and lost one fumble. With the game tied 14-14, Tampa Bay drove to the Panthers 20 yard line in the final minute. After missing two attempts earlier in the game, Roberto Aguayo kicked a 38-yard game-winning field goal as time expired.

Week 7: at San Francisco 49ers

Jameis Winston threw for 269 yards and three touchdown passes, while Jacquizz Rodgers rushed for 154 yards. After falling behind 14–0, Tampa Bay scored 27 unanswered points, and pulled away for a 34–17 victory.

Week 8: vs. Oakland Raiders

In this Super Bowl XXXVII rematch, Raiders quarterback Derek Carr threw for 513 yards and four touchdown passes as the Raiders won in overtime. With 1:55 remaining in the overtime period, on a 4th down & 3, Carr threw a game-winning 41-yard touchdown pass to Seth Roberts.

Week 9: vs. Atlanta Falcons

Tampa Bay's only highlight came in the fourth quarter when Mike Evans made a spectacular one-handed sideline catch. However, he was hit and left the game with a concussion. He did finish on a solid note with 11 receptions along with 150 yards and two scores.

Week 10: vs. Chicago Bears

Tampa Bay beat Chicago in dominating fashion for their first home victory of the season. Chris Conte intercepted a Jay Cutler pass and returned the ball 20 yards for a touchdown in the first quarter to start the scoring. Jameis Winston threw for 312 yards and two touchdowns, including a busted play and scramble to his own endzone which resulted in a remarkable 39-yard completion to Mike Evans. Doug Martin returned to the lineup, and scored a rushing touchdown.

Week 11: at Kansas City Chiefs

Tampa Bay won their second straight game, this one against a team that was highly favored to win. Jameis Winston threw for over 300 yards while Mike Evans received for over 100 yards. The offense was efficient, especially on third down where they went 11 of 15. The defense came up big as well, with safety Chris Conte getting an interception in the end zone, his second straight game with a pick. Rookie kicker Roberto Aguyao, who has struggled throughout the season, went 5/5 on kicks, making 4 field goals and 1 extra point. With this win, the Bucs got back to .500, took sole possession of second place in the NFC South, and improved their road record to 4-1.

Week 12: vs. Seattle Seahawks

Coming into a game where Seattle was highly favored to win, Tampa Bay earned their third straight win in impressive fashion. After scoring two Winston to Evans touchdowns in the first quarter, the defense held up and didn't allow any offensive touchdowns. The only points scored against them were a safety after a holding call in the endzone and a Seattle field goal. The defense also held Seattle to just one 3rd down conversion on 11 attempts, with the sole conversion coming in the 4th quarter. Seattle QB Russell Wilson was sacked six times and two of his passes were intercepted, one of those interceptions coming from CB Alterraun Verner. With this upset win, the Bucs moved over .500 for the first time through 11 games since 2012, and sits a half a game behind the final wildcard spot.

Week 13: at San Diego Chargers

The Bucs won their fourth consecutive game. After being down at the half 14–7, the Bucs outscored the Chargers 21–7 in the second half. The win gives the Bucs a 7–5 record (5–1 on the road) and since the Redskins (6–4–1) lost, the Bucs took over the final wildcard spot. Also since the Falcons (7–5) lost, they are now tied with them atop the NFC South. After the game, the Week 15 matchup against the Dallas Cowboys was flexed from a normal 1 p.m. kickoff to Sunday Night Football.

Week 14: vs. New Orleans Saints

The Buccaneers won their fifth consecutive game after another impressive showing from the defense. The defense picked off Drew Brees three times, including one to seal the win. They also held the Saints offense to zero offensive touchdowns. The win puts the Buccaneers at 8–5, and they now have a chance to finish the season with a record over .500, the first since the 2010 season.

Week 15: at Dallas Cowboys

The Buccaneers five-game winning streak came to an end with this loss. After being down 17–6 at the half, the Bucs came out hot in the second half scoring two touchdowns on throws to receiver Adam Humphries and tight end Cameron Brate, taking a 20–17 lead going into the fourth quarter. After three Dallas field goals in the fourth, the Bucs had a chance to drive down the field for a last second touchdown. On 4th down with around 30 seconds remaining, Winston threw an interception to seal the game. With the loss, the Buccaneers move to 8–6 on the season.

Week 16: at New Orleans Saints

The Bucs' playoff hopes took hits after a second loss in a row, this time to the New Orleans Saints. Their defense was shaky, as they allowed 13 points in the first half of the game, and 18 points in the second half. This put the Bucs outside the playoff picture, and left them requiring victory in week 17 as well as hoping for the Washington Redskins and the Green Bay Packers to both lose. Mark Ingram II scored two touchdowns, during the game, and Jameis Winston was picked off twice during the game, unlike the previous meeting of the two teams a couple weeks ago.

Week 17: vs. Carolina Panthers

The Bucs closed out the season sweeping the season series against Carolina. The game came down to the wire, with Carolina coming within one after scoring a touchdown with 17 seconds left to play. Instead of tying it up with an extra point, Carolina failed on an attempted two-point conversion. In addition to this win, the Buccaneers' playoff hopes required six other Week 17 results (including a tie between the New York Giants and Washington Redskins) to fall their way in order to secure a strength-of-victory tiebreaker over the Green Bay Packers for the final wild-card berth. They were officially eliminated from playoff contention after the New York Giants defeated the Washington Redskins. However, they finished 9–7, their first winning record since finishing 10–6 in the 2010 season, and would pick 19th overall in the upcoming NFL Draft.

Standings

Division

Conference

Awards
 Week 1: NFC Offensive Player of the Week — Jameis Winston
 Week 1: FedEx Air Player of the Week — Jameis Winston
 Week 5: Castrol Edge Clutch Performer of the Week — Roberto Aguayo
 Week 11: NFC Special Teams Player of the Week — Roberto Aguayo
 Week 12: Pepsi Next Rookie of the Week — Noah Spence
 November: Defensive Rookie of the Month — Noah Spence
 Week 14: Castrol Edge Clutch Performer of the Week — Keith Tandy
 Week 17: NFC Special Teams Player of the Week — Bryan Anger
 Week 17: Castrol Edge Clutch Performer of the Week — Mike Evans
 Bridgestone Performance Play of the Year — Jameis Winston & Mike Evans

Notes

References

Tampa Bay
Tampa Bay Buccaneers seasons
Tampa Bay Buccaneers